Levi Colbert (1759–1834), also known as Itawamba in Chickasaw, was a leader and chief of the Chickasaw nation. Colbert was called Itte-wamba Mingo, meaning bench chief. He and his brother George Colbert were prominent interpreters and negotiators with United States negotiators in the early decades of the 19th century. They were appointed by President Andrew Jackson's administration to gain cession of their lands and arrange for removal of their people to Indian Territory west of the Mississippi River. They were under considerable pressure from the Mississippi state government, white interlopers in their area, and the federal government to cede their lands.

Levi Colbert (Itawamba) worked most closely with  US Indian Agent John Dabney Terrell, Sr. of Marion County, Alabama. The Chickasaw negotiated hard; after their representatives initially surveyed the lands offered in the West, they returned saying it was unacceptable. The Chickasaw worked to gain more approval over their future lands.

Early life and education
Levi Colbert was born in 1759  as one of six sons of James Logan Colbert (1721 - 1784), a North Carolinian of Scots ancestry, and his second wife Sopha Minta Hoye, a Choctaw woman. Colbert, known in Chickasaw as Itawamba, was born in Muscle Shoals, Alabama, within what was the Chickasaw Nation, in a tribal settlement along the Tennessee River. He and his mixed-race siblings grew up bilingual and were educated in both Chickasaw and European-American traditions. 

As the Chickasaw had a matrilineal kinship system of descent and inheritance, children were considered to belong to the mother's clan. They gained their status through her, and hereditary leadership for males was passed through the maternal line. Colbert attended Charity Hall School. 

When Levi Colbert assumed the hereditary title of head chief of the Chickasaw Nation, he was living on the bluff west of the Chickasaw trading post known as Cotton Gin Port, established near the old cotton gin. The post was marked by a large spreading oak known as the council tree.

Removal

Levi Colbert and his brother George were prominent among the negotiators for the Chickasaw when they met with US government officials related to treaties and removal. A written report given to the US Senate on January 15, 1827 noted that US commissioners assigned to negotiate a treaty with the Chickasaw Nation had met in parley on November 1, 1826 with members of that tribe. It reported that Levi Colbert, on behalf of agents of that nation, said that "there was not a man in the nation who would consent to sell either the whole or part of their lands." Although opposed to the Indian Removal Act of 1830, the Chickasaw chiefs of the council signed a treaty, based on the tribe's removal, in a treaty meeting with General John Coffee and other United States representatives in November 1832. They wanted to keep peace, and they were suffering from the aggressive and hostile behavior of the Mississippi state government, as well as white settlers in their territory. Their removal was to west of the Mississippi River to Indian Territory.  This treaty promised 25 cents per acre for their land, less than half of what the government had initially promised.

In a long letter to President Andrew Jackson in November 1832, Colbert noted the many complaints the chiefs had with the resulting Treaty of Pontotoc Creek. He restated their position, and noted their belief that General Coffee had ignored their comments and viewpoints.  They had wanted the tribe to keep control of the money resulting from sale of their lands, they were not ready to choose land in Indian Territory, they did not want to share a reservation in Indian Territory with "half breeds" (mixed-race persons they did not consider members of their people), and they were dismayed at the way they had been treated by General Coffee.  More than 40 chiefs who had attended the treaty council signed the letter with Colbert. They were chiefs of the clans and leading villages.

Colbert had been ill during the meeting and was unable to attend all the sessions. He died in 1834, two years after the final treaty was signed and Chickasaws were preparing to remove to Indian Territory.

Some of Colbert's goals were achieved in a treaty of 1837, which enabled the tribe to control monies resulting from the sale of their homesteads and ensured they would be compensated for improvements.

Intra-tribal conflict
Colbert did not want conflict; he wanted peace with the US government, even if it meant giving up his people's land.  He wanted to try to preserve his people's rights during negotiations, as they were pressured by increasing conflict with encroaching European-American settlers and governments. He was very concerned that the federal government was treating equally with mixed-race men he called "half-breeds." Although Colbert was of mixed descent, he had grown up identifying with the Chickasaw culture and his mother's clan.

He believed some white men were marrying into the tribe just to try to get control of land. By the 1830s, he felt such men were ignoring traditional practices and the tribe's recognized chiefs in seeking personal gain.

Family 
"He married three times. He married Ishtimmarharlechar. She was listed as a resident in the census report in Chickasaw Roll, Chickasaw Nation, MS, 1818. He married Temusharhoctay 'Dollie' (Schtimmarshashoctay) before 1795. Temusharhoctay was born before 1780. She was listed as a resident in the census report in Chickasaw Nation, MS, 1818. He married Mintahoyo House of Imatapo before 1799. Mintahoyo was born before 1799. Mintahoyo died after 1839." Most of the younger children were educated at Charity Hall school, a mile and a half from their home, (also called Bell Indian Mission). It has been described as "a mission school ... established in 1820, near Cotton Gin Port, Mississippi, by Rev. Robert Bell, under the auspices of the Cumberland Presbyterian Church, for the education of Chickasaw children."

Death
Colbert died June 2, 1834, at Buzzard Roost, Alabama, His brother George Colbert succeeded him as leader of the Chickasaw.

Legacy
Several places were named after him:
Itawamba County, Mississippi
Colbert's Spring, Alabama 
Colbert County, Alabama was named after him and his brother George Colbert.

See also
Colbert County, Alabama
George Colbert, his brother
Holmes Colbert, his nephew and writer of the Chickasaw Constitution
Trebloc, Mississippi

References

Further reading
"Refusal of the Chickasaws and Choctaws to Cede Their Lands in Mississippi: 1826", Avalon Project, Yale University
Kerry M. Armstrong, compiler, Chickasaw Historical Research Website, includes numerous primary sources, including some dating to before Removal

External links 
Levi Colbert Profile and Videos - Chickasaw.TV
Natchez Trace Parkway - Buzzard Roost Spring, near Cherokee, AL, Home place and site of inn run by Chickasaw chief Levi Colbert 

Photographs of Buzzard Roost Spring
Poem about Levi Colbert and his daughter

1759 births
1834 deaths
19th-century Native Americans
Chickasaw people
Colbert County, Alabama
Native American leaders
People from Muscle Shoals, Alabama